The Mount Lebanon Shaker Village is a historic site associated with the Shakers, a Protestant religious denomination. Founded as a communal group in the 1787, the Shakers located their Central Ministry in New Lebanon, New York, United States, and built a village that eventually covered several thousand acres and housed hundreds of Believers. (See also Mount Lebanon Shaker Society and Isaac N. Youngs.)

Shaker Museum | Mount Lebanon is moving from Old Chatham, New York to the Mount Lebanon Shaker Village. They are in the process of restoring the buildings of the former Shaker North Family there.

See also 
 Shaker Seed Company

References

External links 
 Shaker Museum | Mount Lebanon website for the North Family historic site's managing museum.
 Information about Mount Lebanon Shaker Village 

Museums in Columbia County, New York
Shaker communities or museums
Religious museums in New York (state)
Open-air museums in New York (state)